La Grange is the name of some places in the U.S. state of Wisconsin:
La Grange, Monroe County, Wisconsin, a town
La Grange, Walworth County, Wisconsin, a town
La Grange (community), Wisconsin, an unincorporated community in Walworth County, Wisconsin